Museum voor Schone Kunsten may refer to:

Museum of Fine Arts, Ghent (Museum voor Schone Kunsten Gent)
Museum of Fine Arts, Ostend (Museum voor Schone Kunsten Oostende)
Royal Museum of Fine Arts, Antwerp (Koninklijk Museum voor Schone Kunsten Antwerpen)
Royal Museums of Fine Arts of Belgium (Koninklijke Musea voor Schone Kunsten van België)